Havardia albicans is a perennial tree of the family Fabaceae that grows to 5 meters tall. It is native to Mexico, the Caribbean and Central America, in regions around the Yucatan Peninsula. Common names for it include chucum and cuisache. It is reputed to be psychoactive.

Junior synonyms are:
 Acacia albicans Kunth
 Albizia lundellii Standl.
 Albizia rubiginosa Standl.
 Feuilleea albicans (Kunth) Kuntze
 Pithecellobium albicans (Kunth) Benth.
 Pithecolobium albicans (Kunth) Benth. (lapsus)

Footnotes

References
  (2005): Havardia albicans. Version 10.01, November 2005. Retrieved 2008-MAR-30.
  (2004): Enzyklopädie der psychoaktiven Pflanzen, Botanik, Ethnopharmakologie und Anwendungen (7th ed.). AT Verlag.

External links
  
 Havardia albicans Branch with Blossoms www.fieldmuseum.org
 Havardia albicans Branch with Seed Pod www.fieldmuseum.org
 The New York Botanical Garden

albicans
Trees of Mexico
Trees of Belize
Entheogens
Trees of Guatemala